FUJIFILM VisualSonics Inc. (originally VisualSonics Inc.) is a biomedical company focused on the commercialization of high-frequency ultrasound and photoacoustic imaging equipment for research purposes. The company is headquartered in Toronto, Canada (with European headquarters in Amsterdam).

History 
VisualSonics was founded in 1999 by Stuart Foster, Medical Physicist out of Sunnybrook Research Institute, Toronto.  Dr. Foster's laboratory had been focused on developing a higher frequency ultrasound system since 1983 in order to better study mouse models of human disease. In 2010 the company was acquired by the American clinical ultrasound company, SonoSite Inc. (based in Bothell, WA). In 2012, FUJIFILM Holdings acquired SonoSite Inc.

Products 
FUJIFILM VisualSonics is recognized for advancing the development of micro-ultrasound and photoacoustic technology for clinical and preclinical research. The company's key product releases have included: Vevo 770 imaging system for preclinical cardiovascular research; Vevo 3100 micro-ultrasound imaging system for enhanced small animal in vivo studies; Vevo LAZR-X multi-modal imaging platform; and Vevo MD for high resolution clinical research applications.

References

External links 
 Official Website

Biomedicine
Companies based in Toronto
Medical imaging